Bilca is a commune located in Suceava County, Romania. It is composed of a single village, Bilca.

Notable people  
 Traian Brăileanu
 George Tofan

Gallery

References

Communes in Suceava County
Localities in Southern Bukovina